Mead is an impact crater on Venus named in honor of the cultural anthropologist Margaret Mead.

Mead crater is the largest impact crater on Venus, with a diameter of 280 km (174 miles). The crater has an inner and an outer ring and a small ejecta blanket surrounding the outer ring. Mead crater is relatively shallow (likely due to viscous relaxation and infilling) and crater floor looks very similar in morphology to the surrounding plain.

Mead is classified as a multi-ring crater with its innermost, concentric scarp being interpreted as the rim of the original crater cavity. No inner peak-ring of mountain massifs is observed on Mead. The presence of hummocky, radar-bright crater ejecta crossing the radar-dark floor terrace and adjacent outer rim scarp suggests that the floor terrace is probably a giant rotated block that is concentric to, but lies outside, the original crater cavity. The flat, somewhat brighter inner floor of Mead is interpreted to result from considerable infilling of the original crater cavity by impact melt and/or by volcanic lavas. To the southeast of the crater rim, emplacement of hummocky ejecta appears to have been impeded by the topography of preexisting ridges, thus suggesting a very low ground-hugging mode of deposition for this material.

References

External links
 Image of the crater at www.espacial.org. Retrieved 18 April 2016.

Impact craters on Venus